Puducherry (French: Réseau routier de Pondichéry) has a network of all-weather metalled roads connecting every village in the territory. The territory has a total road length of 2552 km (road length per 4.87 km2).

Road length comparison

Classification of roads

See also 
 Road Network in Pondicherry District
 Road Network in Karaikal District
 Road Network in Yanam District
 Road Network in Mahe District

External links
 Official website of Public Works Department, Puducherry UT
 Infrastructure in Puducherry Union Territory
 Puducherry UT Statistics

Roads in Puducherry
Transport in Puducherry